Many terms are used in the marketing field.

AIDA (marketing)
Arrow information paradox
Attack marketing
Bargain bin
Business-to-business
Business-to-consumer
Business-to-government
Cause marketing
Copy testing
Cost per conversion
Customer lifetime value
Customer relationship management
Decision making unit
Disintermediation
Double jeopardy (marketing)
Double loop marketing
Emotional Branding
Engagement (marketing)
Facelift (product)
Fallacy of quoting out of context
Fine print
Flighting (advertising)
Growth Hacking
Heavy-up
Inseparability
Intangibility
Integrated marketing communications
Low-end market
Marketing communications
Marketing experimentation
Marketing exposure
Marketing information system
Marketing mix for product software
Marketing speak
Megamarketing
Name program
Next-best-action marketing
Nielsen ratings
Out-of-box experience
Perishability
Permission marketing
Price Analysis
Product lifecycle
Product lifecycle management
Promoter (entertainment)
Q Score
Relational goods
Representative office
Response rate ratio
Return on event
Return on investment
ROI – Return on Investment 
Science-to-business marketing
SEO – search engine optimization
Share of Wallet
Soft launch
Solutions Marketing
Sports Entertainment
Square inch analysis
Sweeps period
Top of mind awareness
Visual merchandising
White label

References

 List
Marketing-related lists
Business terms